William Edward Barnes (1924 – 31 August 2006) was an Irish boxer. He competed in the men's flyweight event at the 1948 Summer Olympics.

References

External links
 

1924 births
2006 deaths
Date of birth missing
Irish male boxers
Olympic boxers of Ireland
Boxers at the 1948 Summer Olympics
Flyweight boxers